Robert  Tollast (1915-2008) was a British painter. He studied Fine Arts at the Westminster School of Art. During World War II, he was commissioned in the Intelligence Corps and joined the diplomatic service as an Attaché de Presse in the British embassies of Baghdad and Cairo. He resigned in 1948 to become a full-time portrait painter and in 1949 had his first one-man show in London and exhibited at the Royal Academy. A period of global travelling was followed by ten years painting in the United States (New York and Washington D.C.) His exhibition at the Washington gallery was opened by the then British Ambassador, the Earl of Cromer, formerly Governor of the Bank of England. In the early 1960s, he spent time in Cambridge doing portraits of college luminaries and also for local families.

After he returned to England in 1976, Robert Tollast divided his time among Switzerland, France (Paris) and Italy (Milan and Florence) and Austria (Vienna) with occasional visits to Germany.

During long visits to South Africa, he painted three generations of the Oppenheimer family, among other prominent figures in industry.

The list of Tollast's most interesting portrait commissions includes clients internationally prominent in the arts, sciences, industry and politics, of which one of the most notable is that of Sir Winston Churchill. This was the last official portrait, of which the sitter — notoriously difficult over portraits of himself — went on record to express his approval.

Robert Tollast's most recent important commission was to paint, in oil, all the partners of the partners of the Geneva private bank Lombard Odier & Cie. He also works in water-colour and pastel and is a notably successful painter of children.

At the time of his death, Tollast was royal court painter to the Habsburg family of Austria.

References

External links
National Portrait Gallery page

2008 deaths
1915 births
20th-century English painters
21st-century English painters
Alumni of the Westminster School of Art
Artists from London
Court painters
English male painters
20th-century English male artists
21st-century English male artists